Silvia Muñoz Escudé (born September 18, 1979 in Terrassa, Catalonia) is a field hockey midfield and forward player from Spain. She represented her native country at three consecutive Olympic Games: 2000, 2004 and 2008. Muñoz captained the Spain national team that finished fourth at the 2006 Women's Hockey World Cup in Madrid, where they missed the bronze medal match against Argentina due to injury.

References
 Spanish Olympic Committee

External links
 

1979 births
Living people
Spanish female field hockey players
Field hockey players from Catalonia
Olympic field hockey players of Spain
Field hockey players at the 2000 Summer Olympics
Field hockey players at the 2004 Summer Olympics
Field hockey players at the 2008 Summer Olympics
Sportspeople from Terrassa